Véronique De Roose (born 30 October 1970) is a former Belgian racing cyclist. She won the Belgian national road race title in 1990.

References

External links

1970 births
Living people
Belgian female cyclists
People from Oudenaarde
Cyclists from East Flanders